Leopold Maier-Labergo (3 March 1907 – 9 May 1939) was a German figure skater. He was born in Salzburg, Austria.

Maier-Labergo was a three-time German men's champion in figure skating between 1930 and 1942. He came in fifth place at the 1931 World Championships, but never participated in the Olympics or the European Championships. At club level, he represented Münchner EV (based in Munich), where his coach was Ludwig Niedermayer.

After Maier-Labergo's amateur career he became a professional skater and skating coach in Winnipeg, Manitoba, Canada, where he was known as Leopold Labergo. One of his students was Mary Rose Thacker, a future Canadian and North American champion, while others included Fraser Sweatman and Audrey Garland, who skated for Canada at the 1936 Winter Olympics. A graduate of the University of Munich in music, he was an accomplished pianist who taught music, and gave occasional recitals on CKY-FM. Maier-Labergo died in Winnipeg in 1939, aged 32, at the Misericordia Health Centre. His death came after a short illness, and was unexpected.

Competitive highlights in figure skating

References
 Obituary in The Winnipeg Tribune, May 9, 1939, p. 5
 Vital Statistics Agency (Manitoba), Genealogy Searches for Unrestricted Records
 Eis- und Rollsport, 49th year, No. 9, 5 January 1939

1907 births
1939 deaths
Austrian emigrants to Germany
Canadian classical pianists
Canadian people of Austrian descent
German emigrants to Canada
German male single skaters
Ludwig Maximilian University of Munich alumni
Sportspeople from Salzburg
20th-century Canadian pianists
Canadian male pianists